Ischasioides is a genus of beetles in the family Cerambycidae, containing the following species:

 Ischasioides crassitarsis (Gounelle, 1911)
 Ischasioides gounellei Tavakilian & Penaherrera-Leiva, 2003

References

Rhinotragini